The flexor carpi ulnaris (FCU) is a muscle of the forearm that flexes and adducts at the wrist joint.

Structure

Origin
The flexor carpi ulnaris has two heads; a humeral head and ulnar head. The humeral head originates from the medial epicondyle of the humerus via the common flexor tendon. The ulnar head originates from the medial margin of the olecranon of the ulnar and the upper two-thirds of the dorsal border of the ulnar by an aponeurosis. Between the two heads passes the ulnar nerve and ulnar artery.

Insertion
The flexor carpi ulnaris inserts onto the pisiform, hook of the hamate (via the pisohamate ligament) and the anterior surface of the base of the fifth metacarpal (via the pisometacarpal ligament).

Action
The flexor carpi ulnaris flexes and adducts at the wrist joint.

Innervation
The flexor carpi ulnaris is innervated by the ulnar nerve. The corresponding spinal nerves are C8 and T1.

Tendon
The tendon of flexor carpi ulnaris can be seen on the anterior surface of the distal forearm. On a person's distal forearm, just before the wrist, there are either two or three tendons. The tendon of the flexor carpi ulnaris is the most medial (closest to the little finger) of these. The most lateral one is the tendon of flexor carpi radialis muscle, and the middle one, not always present, is the tendon of palmaris longus.

Function
The muscle, like all flexors of the forearm, can be strengthened by exercises that resist its flexion. A wrist roller can be used and wrist curls with dumbbells can also be performed. These exercises are used to prevent injury to the ulnar collateral ligament of elbow joint.

Variability
The muscle can be doubled as accessory flexor carpi ulnaris muscle and is often accompanied by concomitant variants.

Clinical significance
Ulnar entrapment by the aponeurosis of the two heads of the flexor carpi ulnaris muscle may cause cubital tunnel syndrome.

Tendon of flexor carpi ulnaris can be used for tendon transfer.

Additional images

References

External links 
 

Muscles of the upper limb
Forearm